is a train station located in Asahikawa, Hokkaidō, Japan. It is operated by the Hokkaido Railway Company. Only local trains stop. The station is assigned station number F30.

Lines serviced
Furano Line

Surrounding Area
  Route 237
 Asahikawa Medical University and Hospital

External links
Station information by JR Hokkaido Asahikawa Branch 

Railway stations in Hokkaido Prefecture
Railway stations in Japan opened in 1996
Buildings and structures in Asahikawa